Chris Scott (born August 4, 1987) is an American football offensive guard who is currently a free agent. He played college football at the University of Tennessee and was selected by the Pittsburgh Steelers in the fifth round (151st overall) in the 2010 NFL Draft.

Professional career

Pittsburgh Steelers
Scott was drafted by the Pittsburgh Steelers in the fifth round, 151st overall, in the 2010 NFL Draft. He played in two games for the Pittsburgh Steelers in 2011 before being cut by the team on October 5, 2011 and re-signed to the practice squad. He signed a future contract with the team on January 10, 2012, but was released on August 31, 2012.

Green Bay Packers
Scott was signed to the Green Bay Packers' practice squad on September 3, 2012, but was released by the team on October 23, 2012.

Tampa Bay Buccaneers
Scott was signed to the Tampa Bay Buccaneers' practice squad on October 31, 2012, but was released by the team on November 27, 2012.

Tennessee Titans
Scott was signed to the Tennessee Titans' practice squad on December 4, 2012.

Buffalo Bills
Scott was signed by the Buffalo Bills off the Titans' practice squad on December 6, 2012. He was released by the team on July 27, 2013.

Carolina Panthers
On August 2, 2013, Scott was signed by the Carolina Panthers. He played in 10 games with eight starts with the Panthers.

On August 30, 2014, he was released by the team. On October 14, 2014, he was signed to the Panthers' practice squad. On October 21, 2014, he was promoted to the active roster. On February 17, 2015, he was signed a one-year contract extension with the Panthers.

On February 7, 2016, Scott was part of the Panthers team that played in Super Bowl 50. In the game, the Panthers fell to the Denver Broncos by a score of 24–10.

On March 13, 2017, Scott re-signed with the Panthers. He was placed on injured reserve on September 2, 2017. He was released on September 11, 2017.

New York Giants
Scott was given a tryout by the New York Giants in their 2018 rookie minicamp. The Giants new general manager Dave Gettleman is familiar with Scott from their days together with the Panthers. On May 14, 2018, he officially signed with the Giants. He was released on September 1, 2018.

References

External links
Tampa Bay Buccaneers bio
Pittsburgh Steelers bio
Tennessee Volunteers bio

1987 births
Living people
People from Riverdale, Georgia
Sportspeople from the Atlanta metropolitan area
Players of American football from Georgia (U.S. state)
American football offensive guards
Tennessee Volunteers football players
Pittsburgh Steelers players 
Carolina Panthers players
New York Giants players